Carlo Teodorani (born 12 April 1977) is an Italian former footballer who played as a defender.

Career
Teodorani joined Milan along with Mattia Graffiedi in 1999 in a co-ownership deal, with Marcello Campolonghi moving in the opposite direction. In June 2000 the co-ownership deal was terminated. In January 2001 Teodorani moved to Hellas Verona F.C. for 3,000 million lire (€1,549,371) in another co-ownership deal which was terminated in June 2001 for an additional 1,400 million lire (€723,040).

Footnotes

References

External links
Profile at Lega-Calcio.it

1977 births
Living people
People from Savignano sul Rubicone
Italian footballers
A.C. Cesena players
A.C. Milan players
Hellas Verona F.C. players
Ternana Calcio players
A.C. Reggiana 1919 players
Serie B players
Association football defenders
Footballers from Emilia-Romagna
Sportspeople from the Province of Forlì-Cesena